"Lie" is a song by American rapper NF. It serves as the fourth single from his third studio album, Perception (2017), and was released on April 17, 2018, for digital download and streaming. It was written by NF alongside Mike Elizondo, Jr. and producer Tommee Profitt.

Background
"Lie" was released on April 17, 2018, as the fourth single for his third studio album, Perception. The song is NF's second mainstream radio release, following "Let You Down". On the track, NF tells the story of a failed relationship and calls out a girl for being "cold" to him and lying about how bad he was to her. Lie is NF's third highest charting song in the United States, peaking at No. 48 on the Billboard Hot 100. Its highest peak on any chart was the US Mainstream Top 40, where it reached No. 8.

Credits and personnel
Personnel
 Nathan Feurstein – songwriter
 Tommee Profitt – songwriter, producer, mixing, instruments, programming
 Mike Elizondo, Jr. – songwriter

Credits adapted from Genius.

Recording
 Tomme Profitt Studios, Grand Rapids, Michigan
 Tomme Profitt Studios, Franklin, Tennessee.

Charts

Weekly charts

Year-end charts

Certifications

References

2018 singles
2017 songs
2010s ballads
NF (rapper) songs
Songs written by Mike Elizondo
Songs written by Tommee Profitt
Songs written by NF (rapper)
American contemporary R&B songs